The Bull Hotel is a 17th-century AA 4-star hotel in the Westgate neighbourhood of Peterborough, Cambridgeshire, opposite the Queensgate shopping centre. The Bull Hotel, a Grade II listed building, is the premier hotel in Peterborough, and is the only AA recognised 4 star hotel in the city centre. It has served as a notable conference location for middle England, with a capacity of 250. The hotel has 118 rooms and is served by The Brasserie and the Pastroudis Bar and Cafe.

References

External links
Official site

Buildings and structures completed in the 17th century
Hotels in Cambridgeshire
Buildings and structures in Peterborough
Grade II listed buildings in Peterborough
Grade II listed hotels
17th-century architecture in the United Kingdom